The Victorian Certificate of Education (often abbreviated VCE) is one credential available to secondary school students who successfully complete year 11 and 12 in the Australian state of Victoria. The VCE is the predominant choice for students wishing to pursue tertiary education. An alternative to VCE is the Victorian Certificate of Applied Learning (VCAL), a vocational based senior secondary school qualification.  About 67% of all 19-year-olds in Victoria had completed the VCE in 2020, compared to about 11% of students completing the VCAL (a very small group completed both).    A small number of government secondary schools, and a somewhat larger number of private schools, offer the IB Diploma Programme as an alternative.

Study for the VCE is usually completed over two years but can be spread over a longer period of time in some cases. It is possible to pass the VCE without completing the end of year exams. The VCE was established as a pilot project in 1987. The earlier Higher School Certificate (HSC) was abolished in 1992.

By 2025, the separate VCAL will be abolished, and vocational training incorporated as an option within the VCE.

Structure
The Victorian Certificate of Education is generally taught in years 11 and 12 of secondary education in Victoria; however, some students are able to commence their VCE studies in year 10 or earlier if the school or institution allows it.

All VCE studies are organised into units. VCE subjects typically consist of four units with each unit covering one semester of study. Each unit comprises a set number of outcomes (usually two or three); an outcome describes the knowledge and skills that a student should demonstrate by the time the student has completed the unit. Subject choice depends on each individual school. Units 3/4 of a subject must be studied in sequential order, whereas units 1/2 can be mixed and matched. Students are not required to complete all the units of a subject as part of the VCE course, meaning they are able to change subject choice between years 11 and 12.

On completing a unit, a student receives either a 'satisfactory' (S) or 'non-satisfactory' (N) result. If a student does not intend to proceed to tertiary education, a 'satisfactory' result is all that is required to graduate with the VCE. If a student does wish to study at a tertiary level then they will require an ATAR. In order to gain an ATAR a student must satisfactorily complete three units of any subject in the English field (at least one English field subject is compulsory) and twelve units in any other subjects.

Assessment
VCE studies are assessed both internally (in school) and externally (through  the Victorian Curriculum and Assessment Authority (VCAA)). During units 1/2 all assessment is internal, while in units 3/4 assessment is conducted both internally and externally.

Internal assessment
Internal assessment is conducted via "school assessed coursework" (SACs) and "school assessed tasks" (SATs).

"School assessed coursework" (SACs) are the primary avenue of internal assessment, with assessment in every VCE study consisting of at least one SAC. SACs are tasks that are written by the school and must be done primarily in class time; they can include essays, reports, tests, and case studies. Some studies in the visual arts and technology areas are also assessed via "school assessed tasks" (SATs). SATs are generally practical tasks that are examined in school. Both SACs and SATs are scaled by VCAA against external assessment; this is to eliminate any cheating or variances in task difficulty.

External assessment
External assessment is conducted in the form of examinations set by the Victorian Curriculum and Assessment Authority for units 3/4 studies. As of 2013, only the General Achievement Test (GAT) will be examined in June, with all subjects now only having one external assessment with the exceptions of mathematics subjects, LOTE studies, which consist of both a written and oral external test, performance studies, which consist of both a written external test and a performance, and Extended Investigations, which consist of an oral presentation and a Critical Thinking Test. All examinations except the Critical Thinking Test for Extended Investigation and the GAT are held in late October and most of November.

Subjects in the LOTE field (languages other than English) are also assessed in the form of oral examinations. Subjects in the Dance, Drama/Theatre Studies and Music fields, as well as Extended Investigations, are assessed by a performance for a VCAA panel of examiners as part of their external assessment. All performance based external assessment (Oral Examinations and Music Performances) are typically held in early October.

General Achievement Test (GAT)

The GAT is an essential part of VCE external assessment. It provides the basis of a quality assurance check on the marking of examinations. Any student who is enrolled in a VCE units 3/4 study is required to sit the GAT.

Scoring

Study scores
A student who satisfactorily completes units 3/4 of a VCE study is eligible for a study score of between 0 and 50. Study scores are calculated by VCAA, and indicate a student's performance in relation to all other students who undertook that study.

Study scores are calculated according to a normal distribution, where the mean is 30 and the standard deviation is 7, with most study scores falling in the range 23 to 37. For studies with many enrolments (1000 or more), a study score of 40 or more places a student in the top 9% of all students in that subject.

Scaling
Scaling is the process that adjusts VCE study scores into ATAR subject scores.  The Victorian Tertiary Admissions Centre (VTAC) adjusts all VCE study scores to equalise results between studies with stronger cohorts, and those with weaker ones. Contrary to common perception, scaling is not based on the difficulty of the subject, as each study score is in fact a ranking. The score adjustment ensures that in those subjects where it is easier to overtake the cohort, the score is adjusted downwards, while in those subjects where it is difficult to rank highly, it is moved upwards.

ATAR

Unscored VCE
It is possible for students to complete an unscored VCE. Under this option, students complete the VCE course but do not sit final exams and are not given an ATAR. The number of students completing an unscored VCE has increased every year since 2015, with 8.3% of VCE students completing an unscored VCE in 2020.

Studies
VCE studies refer to the various subjects available to students to contribute to their successful completion of the qualification. There are currently 128 VCE studies, ranging from diverse fields such as the humanities, science, technology and mathematics. Studies are also permitted to study one or more VCE VET programs, vocational education-based subjects which contribute to the completion of the VCE, whilst also resulting in a nationally recognised VET qualification.

Although a student may choose to study any VCE subject in theory, this is dependent on availability of the specified study at the student's school. Certain schools do not offer certain studies, and as a result, students may pick alternate ones, or choose to study a particular subject through an external institution such as Virtual School Victoria (formerly Distance Education Centre Victoria).

To be awarded the VCE, a student must successfully complete at least:
 3 units of an English subject, with two of those being units 3 and 4
 Three additional Unit 3/4 sequences 
 Pass with a satisfactory of at least 16 units out of the normal 20-24 units 

This therefore means that a student must study at least four subjects to be awarded the VCE. Selection of studies depends on other factors as well, such as prerequisites for university courses.

The following is a list of all VCE studies available: † indicates that study is only available at 3/4 level, * indicates that study is only available at 1/2 level.

There are also University Extension studies available for high-achieving students. These subjects are carried out through multiple universities, including The University of Melbourne, Swinburne University and Deakin University. Monash University formerly offered extension subjects, but cancelled the program in 2019.

Controversies

2011 English exam 
The 2011 English exam contained a column about tattoos attributed to "part-time journalist and blogger Helen Day", who wrote for the fictional "Street Beat" blog. The Age newspaper accused VCAA of plagiarism and breach of copyright as the column was very similar to an opinion piece featured in the newspaper's 23 September 2010 edition, written by Melbourne writer Helen Razer. The newspaper called the exam's column "clumsily edited".

2012 History: Revolutions exam 
In 2012, the History: Revolutions exam was meant to include a picture of Nikolai Kochergin's artwork Storming the Winter Palace on 25th October 1917, depicting the events of the 1917 October Revolution in Russia. Instead, a doctored picture was used in the exam, in which a large robot had been edited in to the background of the scene. (Said robot was a Marauder from BattleTech, a science fiction setting in which a fictional 28th century general named 'Aleksandr Kerensky' like the nonfictional October Revolution leader played an important role during a pivotal coup and civil war.) A VCAA spokesperson admitted that the image was "sourced and acknowledged by the VCAA as coming from the Internet", and new internal guidelines were issued for using internet-sourced content in exams. Of the 5,738 students that sat the exam, 2,379 chose the Russia section, of which 130 received an adjusted score.

2018 English exam 
The 2018 English exam included an article in which fictional writer Jonty Jenkins scathingly attacked a cafe franchise named "Calmer Coffee" opening in his local town, criticising its unfriendly staff and unwelcoming ambience that he described as "an assault on the senses". After the exam completed, students discovered that a real "Calmer Cafe" existed in Aberfeldie, a suburb just north-west of Melbourne. The cafe's manager, Elise Jenkins, shares the same surname as the exam question's fictional writer. Within hours, the cafe received over 100 negative reviews on Google Maps from Year 12 students, bringing down its rating from nearly 5 stars to as low as 3.3. Google Maps temporarily removed the cafe from search results, and later reinstated it but kept reviews inaccessible. At the time, the cafe had 405 reviews.

The next day, Tara Conron, owner of the cafe, told The Age she had hired a lawyer and would be pursuing legal action against VCAA for "uncanny" similarities between the exam and the actual cafe. Conron noted the identical surnames of Jenkins, stated that she employs someone with a "man bun", as does the employer in the exam article, and both the fictional and actual cafe "stand out" in their respective suburbs.

A year later, it was reported that Conron was no longer pursuing legal action against VCAA, telling The Age that the cafe staff had placed the matter behind them, and saying "we’ve just loved to joke about it this year".

2022 Specialist Mathematics Exam 2
On 11 November 2022 The Age newspaper published an article ("For some, this VCE maths exam didn't add up")  alleging errors on the 2022 Specialist Mathematics Exam 2 that included:

Section A Question 4: No correct answer (because the values of a and c can be any real number),

Section A Question 19: No correct answer (because confidence intervals are calculated for unknown population means, not for sample means),

Section B: Question 6 part (f) (the question cannot be answered because the relevant random variables are not stated to be independent).

The Examination Report published by the VCAA for this Exam makes no acknowledgement of these alleged errors. The answers used by the VCAA to mark this exam are not available to the public. It is reasonable to assume they are the same as the answers given in the Examination Report.

See also 
 Department of Education, Victoria
 Engage Education Foundation
 Equivalent National Tertiary Entrance Rank
 Education in Australia
 Senior Secondary Certificate of Education
 University admission

References

External links 
 Victorian Certificate of Education - information about the VCE.
 VCE Study Score Archive - List of high achieving VCE students from 1998 and 2000-2011
 Victorian VCE Results - Australian year 12 database, including VCE student results and school VCE statistics

School qualifications
Education in Victoria (Australia)
Australian Certificate of Education